The 1949 French Championships (now known as the French Open) was a tennis tournament that took place on the outdoor clay courts at the Stade Roland-Garros in Paris, France. The tournament ran from 18 May until 29 May. It was the 53rd staging of the French Championships, and the second Grand Slam tennis event of 1949. Frank Parker and Margaret Osborne duPont won the singles titles.

Finals

Men's singles

 Frank Parker defeated  Budge Patty 6–3, 1–6, 6–1, 6–4

Women's singles

 Margaret Osborne duPont defeated  Nelly Adamson 7–5, 6–2

Men's doubles
 Pancho Gonzales /  Frank Parker  defeated  Eustace Fannin /  Eric Sturgess  6–3, 8–6, 5–7, 6–3

Women's doubles
 Margaret Osborne duPont  /  Louise Brough defeated  Joy Gannon /  Betty Hilton 7–5, 6–1

Mixed doubles
 Sheila Piercey Summers /  Eric Sturgess defeated  Jean Quertier  /  Gerry Oakley  6–1, 6–1

References

External links
 French Open official website

French Championships
French Championships (tennis) by year
French Champ
French Championships
French Championships